The Borders of Azerbaijan define the land and maritime borders of Azerbaijan. Azerbaijan has international land borders with 5 states.

The neighboring countries are Russia to the north, Georgia to the northwest, Iran to the south, Turkey to the west (via the Azerbaijani exclave of Nakhchivan to the northwest) and Armenia to the west and via the Azerbaijani exclave of Nakhchivan to the north and east. To the east, Azerbaijan is bordered by the Caspian Sea which is classified as the world's largest lake and also as a closed sea.

Additionally, in Armenia, there exist three Azerbaijani enclaves: Barxudarlı, Yuxarı Əskipara and Karki (located north of the region of Nakhchivan) Reciprocally, there exists one Armenian enclave, a village called Artsvashen in north-western Azerbaijan.

Because of its large size and being bordered by five countries, it has (still partially undefined) maritime borders and naval forces by all five Caspian littoral states. Azerbaijan's maritime boundaries with Russia and Kazakhstan have been determined, but the boundaries with Iran and Turkmenistan are still disputed.

Land borders
Table of countries with a land border with Azerbaijan.

See also 
 State Border Service (Azerbaijan)
 Border crossings of Azerbaijan

Notes

References